U.S. Route 32 (US 32) was a U.S. Highway from 1926 to 1934, which ran along present-day:
U.S. Route 6 from Omaha, Nebraska to Princeton, Illinois
U.S. Route 34 from Princeton, Illinois to Chicago, Illinois

Notes

References

T32
32
32
32
32
32